Vasile Roaită (1914, Peșteana-Jiu, Gorj –16 February 1933, Bucharest) was a Romanian railway worker for Căile Ferate Române, shot during the Grivița Strike of 1933 and later touted as a proletarian hero under the Communist regime of Gheorghe Gheorghiu-Dej. He is buried at the Izvorul Nou Cemetery in Bucharest.

The spa town of Eforie Sud on the Black Sea coast was named in 1928 Carmen-Sylva, after the pen name of Queen Elisabeth of Romania; the name was changed to Vasile Roaită in 1950, and stayed that way until 1962.  Likewise, the village of Umbrărești-Deal in Galați County was named in 1933 after General Eremia Grigorescu; the name was changed to Vasile Roaită in 1950, and was kept until 1996.

References

1914 births
1933 deaths
Deaths by firearm in Romania
Romanian children
Căile Ferate Române people
People shot dead by law enforcement officers